USS Palau (CVE–122) was a  of the United States Navy.

She was laid down by the Todd-Pacific Shipyards Inc., Tacoma, Washington, 19 February 1945; launched 6 August 1945; sponsored by Mrs. J. P. Whitney; and commissioned 15 January 1946.

Commissioned as the Navy began its post-war demobilization, Palau completed shakedown off California, transited the Panama Canal, underwent post shakedown availability at Boston, and on 11 May moved down the coast to Norfolk where she was immobilized until May 1947. On 22 May she steamed south to Cuba for refresher training, after which she headed north to Norfolk and New York, whence she steamed to Recife, thence to West Africa. She returned to the east coast 16 August and after another availability at Boston was again immobilized at Norfolk, December 1947 – March 1948. During the spring of 1948 she conducted operations off the east coast and on 3 June departed for the Mediterranean to deliver planes, under the Turkish Aid Program, to representatives of that country at Yesilkoy. During this mission the ship and crew helped in the evacuation of U.N. delegation and officials from Haifa on 8 July during the second phase of the Arab–Israeli War. Transiting to Isle of Rhodes and staying there until 24 July with their return to Haifa after a truce was negotiated in the war. Returning to Norfolk 7 August, she remained in the western Atlantic, ranging from the Maritime Provinces to the West Indies, until April 1952. Then departing Norfolk she returned to the Mediterranean to operate with the 6th Fleet until late June, when she resumed duties with the 2nd Fleet on the east coast.

Palau, which was designated for inactivation in early 1953, was retained in commission to perform one final ferry assignment, planes to Yokosuka (8 August – 22 October). On her return she entered the Philadelphia Naval Shipyard, decommissioning 15 June 1954. Berthed with the Philadelphia Group, Atlantic Reserve Fleet, Palau remained a unit of that fleet until struck from the Navy List 1 April 1960 and sold, 13 July 1960, to Jacques Pierot, Jr. and Sons, New York.

Some parts were salvaged from the scrapyard in Sestao, and installed in Picos de Europa as a mountaineers' hut.

References

 

Commencement Bay-class escort carriers
Cold War auxiliary ships of the United States
1945 ships